Nikos Kalokeris (born 2 May 1986) is a Greek professional football defender who is currently playing for Aris Etoliko. Kalokairis previously played for Panetolikos in the Greek Beta Ethniki.

References 

1986 births
Living people
Greek footballers
Panetolikos F.C. players
Association football defenders
Footballers from Agrinio